Stephen Peter "Steve" Brooks is Executive Director of Select Statistical Services Ltd, a statistical research consultancy company based in Exeter, and former professor of statistics at the Statistical Laboratory of the University of Cambridge.

He received a degree in mathematics from Bristol University in 1991, and a master's degree in statistics from the University of Kent. He received his PhD at Cambridge; his supervisor was Gareth Roberts. Post-graduation he then returned to Bristol as a lecturer in the Statistics Group and then Senior Lecturer at the University of Surrey. In 2000 Brooks returned to Cambridge first as a fellow of King's College, Cambridge. and then of Wolfson College.

He is a specialist in Markov chain Monte Carlo and applied statistical methods.

He is one of the founding directors of the National Centre for Statistical Ecology which was set up in 2005.

He left Cambridge in 2006 to become Director of Research for ATASS Sports and is now executive director of Select Statistical Services Ltd a statistical consultancy firm based in Exeter and the Director of the Exeter Initiative for Statistics and its Applications

Career

 1989–1991 Undergraduate, University of Bristol
 1991–1992 Graduate Student, University of Kent
 1992–1993 Research Associate, University of Kent
 1993–1996 Research Student, University of Cambridge
 1996–1999 Lecturer, University of Bristol
 1999–2000 Senior Lecturer, University of Surrey
 2000–2002 Lecturer, University of Cambridge
 2002–2005 Reader, University of Cambridge
 2005–2008 Professor, University of Cambridge
 2006–2011 Director of Research ATASS
 2011-Executive Director Select Statistical Services Ltd

Degrees and Qualifications
1991 BSc Mathematics, Bristol
1992 MSc Statistics, Kent
1996 PhD, Cambridge
1999 Chartered Statistician
2011 Chartered Scientist

Honours and awards
2005 Royal Statistical Society's Guy medal in Bronze
2004 Philip Leverhulme Prize
1999 Royal Statistical Society's Research prize

Books

 Handbook of Markov Chain Monte Carlo edited by Steve Brooks, Andrew Gelman, Galin Jones and Xiao-Li Meng; Chapman and Hall/CRC, 2011
 Bayesian Analysis for Population Ecology by Ruth King, Olivier Gimenez, Byron Morgan and Steve Brooks; Chapman and Hall/CRC, 2009

References

External links
Select Statistical Consulting Home Page
ATASS Ltd Home Page

Living people
English statisticians
Alumni of the University of Bristol
Alumni of the University of Kent
Alumni of the University of Cambridge
Fellows of King's College, Cambridge
Fellows of Wolfson College, Cambridge
Cambridge mathematicians
1970 births